The men's K-2 1000 metres event was a pairs kayaking event conducted as part of the Canoeing at the 2000 Summer Olympics program.

Medalists

Results

Heats
18 crews entered in two heats. The top three finishers from both heats advanced directly to the finals. Fourth through seventh-place finishers in each heat along with the fastest eighth-place finisher advanced to the semifinal.

Overall Results Heats

Semifinal
The top three finishers in the semifinal advanced to the final.

The Czech Republic's reason for disqualification was not disclosed in the official report.

Final

Beniamino Bonomi was so excited after winning the gold that he fell overboard after saluting the Italian team.

References
2000 Summer Olympics Canoe sprint results. 
Sports-reference.com 2000 K-2 1000 m results.
Wallechinsky, David and Jaime Loucky (2008). "Canoeing: Men's Kayak Pairs 1000 Meters". In The Complete Book of the Olympics: 2008 Edition. London: Aurum Press, Limited. p. 476.

Men's K-2 1000
Men's events at the 2000 Summer Olympics